Donfeld (born Donald Lee Feld; July 3, 1934 – February 3, 2007) was a four-time Oscar-nominated American costume designer known for his work on films such as Spaceballs, Prizzi's Honor and The Great Race.

In addition, he made the costumes for the action adventure fantasy television series Wonder Woman, for which he was nominated for an Emmy Award in 1978.

Oscar nominations

All four nominations were in the category of Best Costumes.

35th Academy Awards-Nominated for Days of Wine and Roses (for B/W costumes). Lost to What Ever Happened to Baby Jane?.
42nd Academy Awards-Nominated for They Shoot Horses, Don't They?. Lost to Anne of the Thousand Days.
46th Academy Awards-Nominated for Tom Sawyer. Lost to The Sting.
58th Academy Awards-Nominated for Prizzi's Honor. Lost to Ran.

Selected filmography
 Days of Wine and Roses (1962)
 Mr. Hobbs Takes a Vacation (1962)
 Robin and the 7 Hoods (1964)
 The Great Race (1965)
 They Shoot Horses, Don't They? (1969)
 The April Fools (1969)
 Diamonds Are Forever (1971)
 Tom Sawyer (1973)
 Huckleberry Finn (1974)
 The China Syndrome (1979)
 Prizzi's Honor (1985)
 Spaceballs (1987)
 Father Hood (1993)

Television work
Costume designer for Herb Alpert & The Tijuana Brass TV Specials, "Wonder Woman", "The Beat of the Brass", and "Singer Presents"

References

External links

1934 births
2007 deaths
American costume designers
Artists from Los Angeles
Burials at Rose Hills Memorial Park
Chouinard Art Institute alumni